Karl Neckermann (14 March 1911 in Mannheim – 7 March 1984 in Mannheim) was a German athlete who competed in the 1936 Summer Olympics. Neckermann was a national champion in the 200 meters in 1935, a European champion in the 4x100 relay in 1938, and set a European record in the 100 metres in 1939.

References

External links
 

1911 births
1984 deaths
German male sprinters
Olympic athletes of Germany
Athletes (track and field) at the 1936 Summer Olympics
Sportspeople from Mannheim
European Athletics Championships medalists